The Vésuve class was a class of seven 4-gun gunbrigs (bricks-canonniers).

The Royal Navy captured three of the seven vessels in the class and took them into British service.

Vésuve class (7 ships) 
 Vésuve
Builder: 
Begun: February 1793
Launched: May 1793
Completed: June 1793
Commissioned in the Royal Navy as HMS Vesuve, sold in 1802

 Volage
Builder: Lemarchand, Saint-Malo
Begun: March 1793
Launched: May 1793
Completed: June 1793
Fate: Captured in 1803 by boats from HMS Loire; sold in 1807

 Cruelle
Builder:
Begun: 
Launched:
Completed: 
Fate: 
Notes:

 Foudre
Builder: Saint Malo
Begun: 1793
Launched: January 1794
Completed: February 1794
Fate: Struck in Saint Valéry en Caux in December 1798
Notes: Renamed Fantôme in May 1795

 Hargneuse
Builder: Saint Malo
Begun: 1792
Launched: September 1793
Completed: September 1793
Fate: Decommissioned in Brest in February 1810
Notes: renamed Canonnière n°14 in May 1801

 Protectrice
Builder: Saint Malo
Begun: March 1793
Launched: August 1793
Completed: September 1793
Fate: Decommissioned on 31 March 1807
Notes:

 
Builder: Saint Malo
Begun: 1793
Launched: 1793
Completed: June 1793
Fate: Ran aground in combat against Lapwing, then destroyed by gunfire on 29 November 1796
Notes:

Notes, citations, and references

Notes

Citations

References

Winfield, Rif & Stephen S Roberts (2015) French Warships in the Age of Sail 1786 - 1861: Design Construction, Careers and Fates. (Seaforth Publishing). 

Corvette classes
Age of Sail corvettes of France
Corvettes of the French Navy